The Fender Mustang Bass is an electric bass guitar model produced by Fender. Two variants, the Musicmaster  Bass and the Bronco Bass, have also been produced from time to time using the same body and neck shape.

Design 
Mustang basses utilize, for economic reasons, the same body as the Fender MusicMaster, Bronco, and DuoSonic guitars. They featured a split coil pickup with plastic covering, as opposed to the Precision style pickup with exposed pole pieces. Relatively unique elements of the Mustang bass were the string-through body design, and the 7-bolt bridge. Mustang basses came with the standard "Pull-bar" of the early Fender era, but many beginners moved theirs to the left side of the neck to become a thumbrest for finger playing.

History 

Introduced in 1966 as a companion to Fender's shorter-scaled, two-pickup Fender Mustang guitars, the Mustang Bass was the last original bass designed by Leo Fender before his departure from the company in 1965. The Mustang Bass has a short 30" scale and a single split pickup (similar to the Precision Bass), one volume and one tone control, with strings-through-body routing. Like the early Precision and Jazz basses, the Mustang Bass was fitted with string mutes (although most players removed these).

The standard finishes were red and white. Mustang Basses, like all Fender guitars, were finished in nitrocellulose lacquer up until 1968, thereafter in thick polyester finish. In 1969, both the Mustang guitar and bass were issued with 'Competition' finishes—i.e., red with three white stripes, a thick one between two thinner ones, Lake Placid Blue with lighter blue stripes, etc. and were later available in various plain finishes including black and sunburst. (The yellowing of the lacquer on some early models has also resulted in "rare" colours like Surf Green, in reality a yellowed Competition Blue).

In production almost continuously to 1981, the Mustang Bass was reissued by Fender Japan in 1998,.

The Musicmaster Bass variant was also introduced in the mid-1960s and was originally marketed as a student model. Rather than the split-coil design of the Mustang Bass, it featured a single-coil pickup, which was actually a six-pole Stratocaster guitar pickup under a solid plastic cover. Production ceased around the same time as the Mustang Bass. The Squier Musicmaster Bass was reissued briefly in 1997, only to be discontinued after one year of production and ultimately being replaced by the Bronco Bass.

Fender reintroduced the Mustang Bass as part of the Squier lineup. The Squier Vintage Modified Mustang Bass was released in July 2011, offered in black, or three-tone sunburst with a maple fretboard, a black pickguard and Stratocaster style volume and tone knobs. This model has since been discontinued. From 2012 till 2015, A signature variant of the Squier Mustang bass was produced for My Chemical Romance bassist Mikey Way, finished in large flake silver sparkle with a black competition stripe, based off a special edition Mustang him and his brother, Gerard, wanted as kids. This model has been in high demand in recent years. 

For 2013, Fender launched three new Mustang basses in the Pawn Shop series, which they call an unconventional assortment of "guitars that never were but should have been". They evoke the original "competition" Mustangs of the early 1970s. These basses are available in Candy Apple Red with white stripes, Olympic White with blue stripes, and three color sunburst. Their features include an alder body, "C"-shaped maple neck, 9.5-inch radius rosewood fingerboard with 19 medium jumbo frets, four-ply white pearloid pick-guard, two Jazz Bass control knobs (volume and tone) and a strings-through-body bridge with four adjustable saddles. This time, though, one obtains the huge bass sound of a single humbucking pickup whereas the original had a single-coil pickup. The Pawn Shop Mustang basses were made by Fender Mexico.

A new Fender Mustang PJ model was released at Summer NAMM, 2016.  This model features both P-Bass and Jazz Bass style pickups and is available in Olympic White, Sonic Blue and Torino Red. Capri Orange was introduced in 2017. The Mustang PJ is offered with a pau ferro fretboard as of 2018.

References

 Peter Bertges. The Fender Reference. Bomots, Saarbrücken. 2007. .

External links

 Mustang Bass
 Squier Bronco Bass
 Mustang Pawn Shop Bass
 

Mustang
Musical instruments invented in the 1960s